Barry Kip Averitt (born October 31, 1954) is an American politician who served as a member of the Texas Senate from the 22nd District from 2002 to 2010.

Early life and education 
Averitt was born in West Texas in Crane in Crane County, near Odessa, Texas. Averitt is a graduate of Baylor University in Waco, where he now resides.

Career 
While in the senate, Averitt chaired the Senate Committee on Natural Resources where he authored Senate Bill 3 in 2007, which, following Senate Bill 1 in 1997 and Senate Bill 2 in 2001, is one of the most important bills in modern Texas history related to water. Senate Bill 3 provided a science and stakeholder-driven environmental flow planning process for the state, created the Water Conservation Advisory Council, and set the Edwards Aquifer Authority on the path of creating a habitat conservation plan to protect endangered species in San Marcos and Comal springs.

Averitt inserted language into HB 2649 outlawing the profession of theatrical or architectural lighting designer unless licensed as an engineer, electrician, architect, or interior designer.

Averitt stepped down from his seat on March 8, 2010, citing health problems.

In the June 22, 2010, special election, to complete Averitt's current term, fellow Republican conservative Brian Birdwell of Granbury defeated Averitt's predecessor in the post, David Sibley of Waco, also a Republican. Birdwell led by some 4,000 votes. Sibley was endorsed by former U.S. President George W. Bush, a resident of the senatorial district, then Texas Agriculture Commissioner Todd Staples, and U.S. Representative Joe Barton.

Birdwell, meanwhile, ran unopposed in the November 2, 2010 general election because his Democratic opponent withdrew from the race in September.

Election history
Senate election history of Averitt.

Most recent election

2006

Previous elections

2002

References

External links
Senate of Texas - Senator Kip Averitt official TX Senate website
Project Vote Smart - Senator Kip Averitt (TX) profile
Follow the Money - Kip Averitt
2006 2004 2002 2000 1998 campaign contributions

1954 births
Living people
People from Waco, Texas
People from Crane, Texas
Baylor University alumni
Republican Party members of the Texas House of Representatives
Republican Party Texas state senators
Baptists from Texas
21st-century American politicians
People from McGregor, Texas